Guy Mytton Thornycroft (1 April 1917 – 8 January 1999) was an English first-class cricketer who played in one match for Worcestershire against the Combined Services at Hereford in 1947. He scored 0 and 3 in a heavy Worcestershire defeat.

Thornycroft was born in Blawith, Grange-over-Sands, which was then in Lancashire; he died at the age of 81 in Reading.

External links 
 

1917 births
1999 deaths
English cricketers
Worcestershire cricketers